Sérgio Manuel Fernandes da Conceição (born 12 November 1996) is a Portuguese footballer who plays for Primeira Liga club Portimonense as a full-back.

Football career
Born in Porto, Conceição played for several clubs in the Portuguese third tier, including the reserve team of G.D. Chaves in January 2019. On 2 July that year, he signed for Académica de Coimbra, where he had played as a youth in 2013.

On 28 December 2019, 23-year-old Conceição made his professional debut for Académica in LigaPro as they won 4–3 at home to U.D. Oliveirense. He started the game and was substituted for Hugo Almeida with ten minutes to play.

Having made just one more appearance in Coimbra, Conceição left on 20 August 2020 for C.F. Estrela da Amadora on a one-year contract, with the club back in the third tier following a merger. In his first season, the club won promotion but lost the final in extra time to C.D. Trofense. In 2021–22, he played 29 games as they kept their place in the second division, scoring his first three goals at that level starting with one in a 6–3 home loss to S.L. Benfica B on 29 November; two weeks later he struck the only goal from the penalty spot in a win over second-placed neighbours Casa Pia AC. 

On 29 June 2022, Conceição moved abroad for the first time as a professional, signing for Belgian First Division A club R.F.C. Seraing. He had lived in nearby Liège as a child, while his father played for Standard Liège.

On 1 February 2023, Conceição joined Portimonense on a contract one-and-a-half-year contract with an option for an additional year.

Personal life
Conceição is the eldest of five sons of former Portugal international footballer and current manager Sérgio Conceição. All of the first four embarked on careers in the sport, including Rodrigo and Francisco.

Career statistics

References

1996 births
Living people
Footballers from Porto
Portuguese footballers
Association football defenders
Primeira Liga players
Liga Portugal 2 players
Segunda Divisão players
Belgian Pro League players
F.C. Felgueiras 1932 players
S.C. Espinho players
Associação Académica de Coimbra – O.A.F. players
C.F. Estrela da Amadora players
R.F.C. Seraing (1922) players
Portimonense S.C. players
Portuguese expatriate footballers
Portuguese expatriate sportspeople in Belgium
Expatriate footballers in Belgium